The Ephraim Carnegie Library is a historic one-story building in Ephraim, Utah. It was built in 1914-1915 by Hans Peterson, A.C. Nielson, and Thors Monsen as a Carnegie library, and it was designed in the Beaux-Arts style by Watkins, Birch & Wright. It has been listed on the National Register of Historic Places since October 25, 1984.

References

	
National Register of Historic Places in Sanpete County, Utah
Beaux-Arts architecture in Utah
Library buildings completed in 1914
Carnegie libraries in Utah
1914 establishments in Utah